Provincial road N708 (N708) is a road connecting N709 near Biddinghuizen with N306 near Biddinghuizen]].

External links

708
708